In September, 2010, the geology stream of the Geological Survey of India (GSI), was constituted as 'Central Geological Service' and commonly referred as Central Geological Service (CGS) (केन्द्रीय भूवैज्ञानिक सेवा). The Central Geological Service (CGS) is one of the central natural resource services which is part of the executive branch of the Government of India. The Central Geological Service (formerly Geology stream of GSI) was constituted as an Organized Group ‘A’ Gazetted Service as per DOPT OM No. I-11019/12/2008-CRD dated 19/11/2009 by the Cadre Controlling Authorities.

GSI is organized group 'A' service since 1982  as per DoPT O.M.No.5/12/79-PP-II dated 31.07.1982 and schedule -I. Its number of vacancies and details of the examination are notified on the website of UPSC (www.upsc.gov.in).

The Officers of Central Geological Service (CGS) are recruited by Union Public Service Commission (UPSC) and posted to the Geological Survey of India (GSI). It is an esteemed geological organization officially formed in 1851 by British East India Company. It is a central government organisation in India working as an Attached Office to the Ministry of Mines, Government of India to carry out geological surveys, mineral exploration and allied studies.

Career progression 
A CGS officer undergoes all India field-lab geological training for 10–11 months under the aegis of GSITI, Hyderabad followed by their first posting at State Units, Regions, specialized wings like RSAS, Marine, Coal and Glaciology etc.

Assessment of suitability for promotion and posting 
The performance of CGS officers is assessed through an Annual Performance Appraisal Report (APAR). The report is compiled annually and is initiated by the officers themselves, designated as the Reporting Officer, who lists out their achievements, completion of assigned activities and targets for the year. The report is then modified and commented by the Reviewing Officer, usually the superior of the Reviewing Officer. Reports submitted for CGS officers are forwarded by the Reviewing Officer to the Accepting Authority, who will conduct a final review of the report.

Notes

References 

Geology of India